Madison Square Garden, New York, NY 3/9/81 is a three-CD live album by the rock band the Grateful Dead.  It contains the complete concert recorded at Madison Square Garden in New York City on March 9, 1981.  It was released on September 23, 2022.

The same recording was released on the same day as part of the six-concert, 17-CD box set In and Out of the Garden: Madison Square Garden '81, '82, '83.

Track listing 
Disc 1
First set:
"Feel Like a Stranger" (Bob Weir, John Perry Barlow) – 9:07
"Althea" (Jerry Garcia, Robert Hunter) – 7:52
"C.C. Rider" (traditional, arranged by Grateful Dead) – 8:00
"Ramble On Rose" > (Garcia, Hunter) – 7:41
"El Paso" (Marty Robbins) – 5:31
"Deep Elem Blues" (traditional, arranged by Grateful Dead) – 7:03
"Beat It On Down the Line" (Jesse Fuller) – 3:58
"Bird Song" (Garcia, Hunter) – 11:15
"New Minglewood Blues" (traditional, arranged by Grateful Dead) – 7:02
Disc 2
Second set:
"China Cat Sunflower" > (Garcia, Hunter) – 9:33
"I Know You Rider" > (traditional, arranged by Grateful Dead) – 6:11
"Samson and Delilah"  (traditional, arranged by Grateful Dead) – 7:32
"Ship of Fools" (Garcia, Hunter) – 8:22
Disc 3
"Estimated Prophet" > (Weir, Barlow) – 14:07
"Uncle John's Band" > (Garcia, Hunter) – 11:46
"Drums" > (Mickey Hart, Bill Kreutzmann) – 10:32
"Space" > (Garcia, Phil Lesh, Weir) – 7:30
"The Other One" > (Weir, Kreutzmann) – 7:47
"Stella Blue" > (Garcia, Hunter) – 9:50
"Good Lovin'" (Rudy Clark, Arthur Resnick) – 6:51
Encore:
"U.S. Blues" (Garcia, Hunter) – 5:32

Personnel 
Grateful Dead
Jerry Garcia – guitar, vocals
Mickey Hart – drums
Bill Kreutzmann – drums
Phil Lesh – bass
Brent Mydland – keyboards, vocals
Bob Weir – guitar, vocals
Production
Produced by Grateful Dead
Produced for release by David Lemieux
Executive producer: Mark Pinkus
Associate producers: Ivette Ramos, Doran Tyson
Mastering: Jeffrey Norman
Recording: Dan Healy
Tape restoration and speed correction: Jamie Howarth, John Chester
Art direction: Dave Van Patten, Lisa Glines, Doran Tyson
Original art: Dave Van Patten
Design: Lisa Glines
Photos: Greg Gear, Bob Minkin, Mark Jaffee, Paul Slattery
Liner notes: David Fricke

Charts

References 

2022 live albums
Grateful Dead live albums
Rhino Records live albums